Rhythm Corps is an alternative rock band from Detroit, Michigan beginning in the 1980s.  They released two extended play (EP) records and two full-length albums.  They are most well known for their hit "Common Ground."

History

Rhythm Method formed in 1981 with Michael Persh, Greg Apro (né Aprahamian), Davey Holmbo (a/k/a David Adamson), and Richie Lovsin.  As Rhythm Method, the band played in the Detroit Metro area and attracted a local following.  The  extended play Paquet De Cinq is their only release as Rhythm Method (later runs of the EP called the band Rhythm Corps).  They played shows with The Psychedelic Furs, The Jam, Billy Idol and went on tour with fellow Detroit natives, The Romantics.  They released the independent EP Espirit De Corps in 1985, which included a regional radio hit called "Vanishes".  In 1988, Rhythm Corps released their debut full-length studio album, Common Ground, on Epic.  The album hit No. 104 on the Billboard 200 while the single "Common Ground" hit No. 9 on the Mainstream Rock charts.  In 1991, they released The Future's Not What It Used to Be, which failed to duplicate Common Ground'''s success.

Band members

 Michael Persh - lead vocals/guitar
 Greg Apro - guitar/vocals
 Davey Holmbo - bass/vocals
 Richie Lovsin - drums

Discography

Studio albums

 1988 - Common Ground 1991 - The Future's Not What It Used to BeEPs

 1984 - Paquet De Cinq (originally released in 1982 when the band was called "Rhythm Method"; re-released in 1984 under the "Rhythm Corps" name)
 1985 - Espirit De Corps''

References

External links
 

Alternative rock groups from Michigan
Musical groups established in 1981
Musical groups from Detroit